Angel or Ángel Pérez may refer to:
 Angel Pérez (canoeist) (born 1971), Cuban born naturalised American canoer
 Ángel Pérez (footballer) (born 1981), Spanish football (soccer) player
 Ángel Pérez (volleyball) (born 1982), Puerto Rican volleyball player
 Angel Pérez Otero (born 1970), Puerto Rican politician
 Angel Perez, a fiction character in the book series The Genesis of Shannara by Terry Brooks